The 1991 Heinz Southern 500 was the 21st stock car race of the 1991 NASCAR Winston Cup Series season and the 42nd iteration of the event. The race was held on Sunday, September 1, 1991, in Darlington, South Carolina, at Darlington Raceway, a  permanent egg-shaped oval racetrack. The race took the scheduled 367 laps to complete. At race's end, Leo Jackson Motorsports driver Harry Gant would manage to dominate the late stages of the race, leading the final 70 laps of the race to take his 13th career NASCAR Winston Cup Series victory and his second victory of the season. To fill out the top three, Morgan–McClure Motorsports driver Ernie Irvan and Hendrick Motorsports driver Ken Schrader would finish second and third, respectively.

Background 

Darlington Raceway is a race track built for NASCAR racing located near Darlington, South Carolina. It is nicknamed "The Lady in Black" and "The Track Too Tough to Tame" by many NASCAR fans and drivers and advertised as "A NASCAR Tradition." It is of a unique, somewhat egg-shaped design, an oval with the ends of very different configurations, a condition which supposedly arose from the proximity of one end of the track to a minnow pond the owner refused to relocate. This situation makes it very challenging for the crews to set up their cars' handling in a way that is effective at both ends.

Entry list 

 (R) denotes rookie driver.

Qualifying 
Qualifying was split into two rounds. The first round was held on Thursday, August 29, at 3:00 PM EST. Each driver would have one lap to set a time. During the first round, the top 20 drivers in the round would be guaranteed a starting spot in the race. If a driver was not able to guarantee a spot in the first round, they had the option to scrub their time from the first round and try and run a faster lap time in a second round qualifying run, held on Friday, August 30, at 2:00 PM EST. As with the first round, each driver would have one lap to set a time. For this specific race, positions 21-40 would be decided on time and depending on who needed it, a select amount of positions were given to cars who had not otherwise qualified on time but were high enough in owner's points; up to two provisionals were given. If needed, a past champion who did not qualify on either time or provisionals could use a champion's provisional, adding one more spot to the field.

No drivers would fail to qualify,

Full qualifying results

Race results

Standings after the race 

Drivers' Championship standings

Note: Only the first 10 positions are included for the driver standings.

References

Heinz Southern 500
Heinz Southern 500
Heinz Southern 500
NASCAR races at Darlington Raceway